Nataliya Mikhaylovna Kresova-Rusakova (born 12 December 1979 in Saint Petersburg) is a Russian track and field sprint athlete.

Career 
She won the bronze medal in the 200 metres at the 2006 European Athletics Championships in Gothenburg.

She also competed in the 100 metres hurdles at the 2004 Olympics, reaching the semi-finals. In addition she won a bronze medal at the 2003 Summer Universiade in Daegu. Her personal best time is 12.70 seconds, achieved in July 2004 in Lausanne.

Rusakova represented Russia at the 2008 Summer Olympics in Beijing. She competed at the 100 metres sprint and placed fifth in her first round, which normally meant elimination. However, her time of 11.61 seconds was one of the ten fastest losing times, which resulted in qualification for the second round. There she failed to qualify for the semi finals as her time of 11.49 was the sixth time of her race.

At the 2012 Summer Olympics, she competed in the 200 metres and the 4 x 100 metres, but did not reach the final in either event.

References 

 
 

1979 births
Living people
Athletes from Saint Petersburg
Russian female sprinters
Russian female hurdlers
Olympic female hurdlers
Olympic athletes of Russia
Athletes (track and field) at the 2004 Summer Olympics
Athletes (track and field) at the 2008 Summer Olympics
Athletes (track and field) at the 2012 Summer Olympics
Universiade medalists in athletics (track and field)
Universiade bronze medalists for Russia
European Athletics Championships winners
European Athletics Championships medalists
Russian Athletics Championships winners